The 2005–06 Cleveland State Vikings men's basketball team represents Cleveland State University in the 2005–06 college basketball season. The team was led by third-year head coach Mike Garland. In 2004–05, the Vikings finished 9–17 (6–10 in the Horizon League). Cleveland State played for the first time since late in the 1990–91 season in Woodling Gym, which served as the home of Viking men's basketball from the 1972–73 season until the Wolstein Center opened prior to the 1991–92 season. The win against Rochester College raised CSU's all-time record in the building to 123–21. It was the 75th season of Cleveland State basketball.

Notable players 
 Carlos English

Preseason 
The preseason Horizon League Coaches' Poll picked the Vikings to finish eighth. Raheem Moss was named to the preseason all-Horizon League 2nd team.

Schedule

References 

Cleveland State Vikings men's basketball seasons
Cleveland State Vikings
Viking
Viking